Namin (also Romanized as Namīn) is a city in the Central District of Namin County, Ardabil province, Iran, and serves as capital of the county. At the 2006 census, its population was 10,117 in 2,690 households. The following census in 2011 counted 11,963 people in 3,394 households. The latest census in 2016 showed a population of 13,659 people in 4,105 households.

References 

Namin County

Cities in Ardabil Province

Towns and villages in Namin County

Populated places in Ardabil Province

Populated places in Namin County